Weidling may refer to:

 Helmuth Weidling (1891–1955), German General der Artillerie during World War II
 , a village within the municipality of Klosterneuburg, Lower Austria
 A village within the municipality of Statzendorf, Lower Austria
 Weidling (boat), a type of boat

See also 
Weidlinger (disambiguation)
Weitling (disambiguation)